The Cumberland Compact was signed at a Longhunter and native American trading post and camp near the French Lick aka the "Big Salt Springs" on the Cumberland River on May 13, 1780, by 256 settlers led by James Robertson and John Donelson, where the group settled and built Fort Nashborough, which would later become Nashville, Tennessee. 

The Cumberland Compact was based on the earlier  Articles of the Watauga Association composed in 1772 at the Watauga settlement located on the Watauga River at present day Elizabethton, Tennessee.

The only surviving copy of the Cumberland Compact was discovered in 1846 inside a trunk that once belonged to early pioneer and founder Colonel Samuel Barton. The copy in the Tennessee State Archives is slightly damaged. Other than this the document is intact and legible. 

The Cumberland Compact was composed and signed by 256 colonists. One colonist, James Patrick of Virginia, was illiterate and marked his name with an "X". This constitution called for a governing council of 12 judges who would be elected by the vote of free men 21 years of age or older. Unique to the times, the Compact included a clause that these judges could be removed from office by the people. Government salaries were to be paid in goods. Governors are paid 1,000 deer skins, secretaries are paid 450 otter skins, county clerks are paid 500 raccoon skins, and the constables are paid one mink skin for every warrant served. All males sixteen or older were subject to militia duty.

The compact did establish a contract and relationship between the settlers of the Cumberland region and limited the punishment that could be meted out by the judicial system. Serious capital crimes were to be settled by transporting the offending party to a location under the direct jurisdiction of the State of North Carolina for a proper trial. The compact remained in effect until Tennessee became a state.

Frontier law was brutal and effective. In 1788, at the first court session in Nashville Andrew Jackson was granted permission to practice law. He was immediately handed the job of prosecuting attorney. In 1793, Judge John McNairy sentenced Nashville's first horse thief, John McKain, Jr., to be fastened to a wooden stock one hour for 39 lashes, his ears cut off and cheeks branded with the letter "H" and "T". The first female convicted of stealing soap and thread was stripped to the waist and publicly whipped nine lashes. By 1800, the first divorce was granted between May and Nathaniel Parker. Henry Baker became the first capital punishment case in Davidson County with the first death sentence of "hanged by the neck until he is dead" for stealing a horse. These records survive in a heavy leather bound book in the care of the circuit court clerk.

Signers 
The 256 signers included the following:

 Philip Alston
 Thomas W. Alston
 Colonel Samuel Barton
 John Blakemore Sr.
 John Blakemore Jr.
 Isaac Bledsoe
 Andrew Bushong
 John Caffery
 James Cain
 Francis Catron
 Peter Catron
 Philip Catron
 Thomas Cox
 John Jonathon Crow
 John Donelson
 Thomas Edmondson
 Thomas Hutchings
 Andrew Ewing
 Thomas Fletcher
 Richard Gross 
 William Gowen
 Henry Guthrie
 Samuel Hays
 Francis Hodge
 Daniel Hogan
 Humphrey Hogan
 James Leeper
 George Leeper 
 Isaac Lindsay
 William Loggins
 Robert Lucas
 Edward Lucas
 John Luney
 Peter Luny
 James Lynn
 Kasper Mansker
 Amb's [Ambrose] Mauldin
 Morton Mauldin
 William M McMurray
 John Montgomery
 William Overall
 Nathaniel Overall
 John Pleakenstalver
 James Ray Senior 
 James Ray jr.
 William Ray/Rea
 James Robertson
 Daniel Ratletf
 David Rounsavall
 Isaac Rounsavall
 James Russell (four men by this name)
 Hugh Simpson
 Frederick Stump
 Nicholas Trammel
 John Tucker
 William McWhorter
 Samuel McCutcheon
 Patrick McCutcheon
 Richard Henderson
 Nathaniel Hart
 William H. Moore
 James Shaw
 Samuel Deson
 Samuel Martin
 James Buchanan
 Solomon Turpin
 Isaac Rentfro
 Robert Cartwright
 Hugh Rogan
 Joseph Morton
 William Woods
 David Mitchell
 David Shelton
 Spill Coleman
 Samuel McMurray
 P. Henderson
 Edward Bradley
 Edward Bradley Jr
 James Bradley
 Michael Stoner
 Joseph Mosely
 Francis Armstrong
 George Freland
 James Freland
 John Dunham
 Isaac Johnson
 Adam Kelar
 Thomas Burgess
 William Burgess
 William Green
 Moses Webb
 Absalom Thompson
 John McVay
 James Thomson
 Charles Thomson
 Robert Thomson
 Martain Hardin
 Elijah Thomson
 Andrew Thomson
 William Leaton
 Edward Thomelu
 Isaac Drake
 Jonathan Jening
 Zachariah Green
 Andrew Lucas
 James Patrick (illiterate; signed with an X)
 John Drake
 Daniel Turner
 Timothy Terel
 Isaac Lefever
 Thomas Denton
 Thomas Hendricks
 John Holloday
 William Hood
 John Boyd
 Jacob Stump
 Henry Hardin
 Richard Stanton
 Sampson Sawyers
 John Holson
 Ralph Wilson
 James Givens
 Robert Givens
 James Harrod
 James Buchanan Sr
 William Geioch
 Samuel Shelton
 John Gibson
 Robert Espey
 George Espey
 John Wilson
 James Espey
 Michael Kimberlin
 John Cowan
 William Fleming
 Daniel Mungle
 William Price
 Henry Kerbey
 Joseph Jackson
 Daniel Ragsdil
 Michael Shaver
 Samuel Willson
 John Reid
 Joseph Daugherty
 George Daugherty
 Charles Cameron
 W. Russel Jr
 Hugh Simpson
 Samuel Moore
 Joseph Denton
 Arthur McAdoo
 James McAdoo
 Nathaniel Henderson
 John Evans
 William Bailey Smith
 Jesse Maxey
 Noah Hawthorn
 Charles McCartney
 John Anderson
 Matthew Anderson
 Bartnet Hainey
 Richard Sims
 Titus Murray
 James Hamilton
 Henry Daugherty
 Zach White
 Burgess White
 William Calley
 Perley Grimes
 Samuel White
 Thomas Hines
 Robert Goodloe
 William Barret
 Thomas Shannon
 James Moore
 Edward Moore
 Richard Moore
 Samuel Moore
 Elijah Moore
 John Moore
 Demsey Moore
 Ebenezer Titus
 Mark Roberson
 Charles Campbill
 John Turner
 Patrick Quigley
 Josias Gamble
 Samuel Newell
 Joseph Read
 David Maxwell
 Thomas Jefriss
 Joseph Dunnagin
 John Phelps
 John McMyrty
 D.D. Williams
 John McAdams
 Samson Williams
 Thomas Thompson
 Martin King
 John Allstead
 Nicholas Counrod
 Evin Evins
 Jonathan Evins
 Joshua Thomas
 James Crocket
 Andrew Crocket
 Russell Gower
 John Shannon
 David Shannon
 Jonathan Drake
 Benjamin Drake
 John Drake
 Mereday Rains
 Richard Dodge
 James Green
 James Cooke
 Daniel Johnston
 George Mines
 George Green
 William Moore
 Jacob Cimberlin
 Robert Dockerty
 William Summers
 Lesois Frize
 John Dukham
 Archelaus Allaway
 Nathaniel Hayes
 Isaac Johnson
 Ezekiel Norris
 William Purnell
 John Condey
 Haydon Wells
 John Callaway
 Willis Pope
 Silas Harlan
 Hugh Leeper
 Harmon Consellea
 James Foster
 William Morris
 Nathaniel Bidkew
 A. Tatom
 William Hinson
 Edmund Newton
 Jonathan Green
 John Phillips
 George Flynn
 Daniel Jarrott
 John Owens
 James Freland
 Thomas Molloy
 Jacob Castleman
 George Power

References 

The Mansker Chronicles
Tennessee Encyclopedia

Legal history of Tennessee
History of Nashville, Tennessee
Pre-statehood history of Tennessee
1780 in the United States